The Lanchester 8 hp Phaeton is a brass era automobile designed by Frederick W. Lanchester, developed and built by the Lanchester Motor Company, produced between 1895 and 1900. It was notably the first production vehicle to be powered by a flat twin-cylinder engine.

References 

8 hp Phaeton
Vehicles introduced in 1895
1890s cars
1900s cars